State Route 219 (SR 219), also known as Rosser Road, is a  north-south state highway in Carroll County, Tennessee, connecting US 70 with SR 77, just northeast of Huntingdon.

Route description

SR 219 begins at an intersection with US 70/SR 1 just east of Huntingdon. It goes north to pass through farmland and rural areas before passing through a wooded area, where it crosses a bridge over a large creek. It then reenters farmland shortly before coming to an end at a Y-Intersection with SR 77. The entire route of SR 219 is a rural two-lane highway.

Major intersections

References

219
Transportation in Carroll County, Tennessee